The 4th Bodil Awards ceremony was held on 30 April 1951 in Copenhagen, Denmark, honouring the best national and foreign films of 1950. The event took place in the World Cinema where Born Yesterday had its Danish premiere as part of the celebrations.

Bodil Ipsen and Lau Lauritzen, Jr. won their second Bodil for Best Danish Film in the 4-years history of the awards for Café Paradis. Preben Lerdorff Rye won the award for Best Leading Actor for his role in I gabestokken while Ib Schønberg won the award for Best Supporting Actor for his role in Café Paradis. Best Leading and Supporting Actresses were not awarded. Finance minister H. C. Hansen received the first ever Honorary Bodil Award for lowering film taxes.

Winners

Honorary Award 
 H.C. Hansen for lowering film taxes

See also 
 Robert Awards

References 

Sources
 Film footage from the 4th Bodil Awards

External links 
 Official website

Bodil Awards ceremonies
1950 film awards
1951 in Denmark
1950s in Copenhagen
April 1951 events in Europe